Jordan and Indonesia established diplomatic relations in 1950. Both are Muslim majority countries — despite the challenges — wishes to promote and projects the Islamic values of tolerance, justice and equality. Both nations often share similar stances upon issues in the Middle East, such as the Syrian Civil War and the Israeli–Palestinian conflict. Economy and trade relations are also particularly important, currently Indonesia is Jordan's largest trade partner in ASEAN. Jordan has an embassy in Jakarta, while Indonesia has an embassy in Amman thatis  also accredited to Palestine. Both countries are members of the Organisation of Islamic Cooperation and the Non-Aligned Movement.

History
Since 1950, both nations enjoys close and cordial relations. Both nations saw each counterpart geopolitics potential, as Indonesia saw Jordan as their gate to enter Israel and Palestine, while Jordan also saw Indonesian geopolitical importance in Southeast Asian region. Traditionally, Jordan serves as the gate for Indonesian Muslim and Christian pilgrims wishing to visit the holy sites in Palestine and Israel.

Cooperations
In June 2009, the governments of Indonesia and Jordan have signed a memorandum of understanding on the placement and protection of the Indonesian migrant workers employed in Jordan. There are around 30,000 Indonesians working in formal and informal sectors in Jordan. King Abdullah Bin Al Hussein of Jordania visited Jakarta on February 26, 2014 and met Indonesian President Susilo Bambang Yudhoyono. Both nations expressing their interest to forge a cooperation in defence industry.

Trade and investment
The trade volume between Indonesia and Jordan from January to November 2013 stood at US$438.59 million, with a US$148.96 million surplus for Jordan. Jordan also has expressed their interest to invest in phosphate fertilizer sector by planning to build a phosphate factory in East Kalimantan and investing in PT Pupuk Kaltim.

Notes

External links
Embassy of the Republic of Indonesia in Amman, Jordan
The Embassy of Jordan in Jakarta, Indonesia 

Jordan
Bilateral relations of Jordan